Population ecology is a sub-field of ecology that deals with the dynamics of species populations and how these populations interact with the environment, such as birth and death rates, and by immigration and emigration.

The discipline is important in conservation biology, especially in the development of population viability analysis which makes it possible to predict the long-term probability of a species persisting in a given patch of habitat. Although population ecology is a subfield of biology, it provides interesting problems for mathematicians and statisticians who work in population dynamics.

History
In the 1940s ecology was divided into autecology—the study of individual species in relation to the environment—and synecology—the study of groups of species in relation to the environment. The term autecology (from Ancient Greek: αὐτο, aúto, "self"; οίκος, oíkos, "household"; and λόγος, lógos, "knowledge"), refers to roughly the same field of study as concepts such as life cycles and behaviour as adaptations to the environment by individual organisms. Eugene Odum, writing in 1953, considered that synecology should be divided into population ecology, community ecology and ecosystem ecology, renaming autecology as 'species ecology' (Odum regarded "autecology" as an archaic term), thus that there were four subdivisions of ecology.

Terminology
A population is defined as a group of interacting organisms of the same species. A demographic structure of a population is how populations are often quantified. The total number of individuals in a population is defined as a population size, and how dense these individuals are is defined as population density. There is also a population’s geographic range, which has limits that a species can tolerate (such as temperature).

Population size can be influenced by the per capita population growth rate (rate at which the population size changes per individual in the population.) Births, deaths, emigration, and immigration rates all play a significant role in growth rate. The maximum per capita growth rate for a population is known as the intrinsic rate of increase.

In a population, carrying capacity is known as the maximum population size of the species that the environment can sustain, which is determined by resources available. In many classic population models, r is represented as the intrinsic growth rate, where K is the carrying capacity, and N0 is the initial population size.

Population dynamics

The development of population ecology owes much to the mathematical models known as population dynamics, which were originally formulae derived from demography at the end of the 18th and beginning of 19th century.

The beginning of population dynamics is widely regarded as the work of Malthus, formulated as the Malthusian growth model. According to Malthus, assuming that the conditions (the environment) remain constant (ceteris paribus), a population will grow (or decline) exponentially. This principle provided the basis for the subsequent predictive theories, such as the demographic studies such as the work of Benjamin Gompertz and Pierre François Verhulst in the early 19th century, who refined and adjusted the Malthusian demographic model.

A more general model formulation was proposed by F. J. Richards in 1959, further expanded by Simon Hopkins, in which the models of Gompertz, Verhulst and also Ludwig von Bertalanffy are covered as special cases of the general formulation. The Lotka–Volterra predator-prey equations are another famous example, as well as the alternative Arditi–Ginzburg equations.

Exponential vs. Logistic Growth 
When describing growth models, there are two types of models that can be used: exponential and logistic.

When the per capita rate of increase takes the same positive value regardless of population size, then it shows exponential growth.

When the per capita rate of increase decreases as the population increases towards a maximum limit, then the graph shows logistic growth.

Fisheries and wildlife management 

In fisheries and wildlife management, population is affected by three dynamic rate functions.

Natality or birth rate, often recruitment, which means reaching a certain size or reproductive stage. Usually refers to the age a fish can be caught and counted in nets.
Population growth rate, which measures the growth of individuals in size and length. More important in fisheries, where population is often measured in biomass.
Mortality, which includes harvest mortality and natural mortality. Natural mortality includes non-human predation, disease and old age.

If N1 is the number of individuals at time 1 then

where N0 is the number of individuals at time 0, B is the number of individuals born, D the number that died, I the number that immigrated, and E the number that emigrated between time 0 and time 1.

If we measure these rates over many time intervals, we can determine how a population's density changes over time. Immigration and emigration are present, but are usually not measured.

All of these are measured to determine the harvestable surplus, which is the number of individuals that can be harvested from a population without affecting long-term population stability or average population size. The harvest within the harvestable surplus is termed "compensatory" mortality, where the harvest deaths are substituted for the deaths that would have occurred naturally. Harvest above that level is termed "additive" mortality, because it adds to the number of deaths that would have occurred naturally. These terms are not necessarily judged as "good" and "bad," respectively, in population management. For example, a fish & game agency might aim to reduce the size of a deer population through additive mortality. Bucks might be targeted to increase buck competition, or does might be targeted to reduce reproduction and thus overall population size.

For the management of many fish and other wildlife populations, the goal is often to achieve the largest possible long-run sustainable harvest, also known as maximum sustainable yield (or MSY). Given a population dynamic model, such as any of the ones above, it is possible to calculate the population size that produces the largest harvestable surplus at equilibrium. While the use of population dynamic models along with statistics and optimization to set harvest limits for fish and game is controversial among some scientists, it has been shown to be more effective than the use of human judgment in computer experiments where both incorrect models and natural resource management students competed to maximize yield in two hypothetical fisheries.  To give an example of a non-intuitive result, fisheries produce more fish when there is a nearby refuge from human predation in the form of a nature reserve, resulting in higher catches than if the whole area was open to fishing.

r/K selection

An important concept in population ecology is the r/K selection theory. For example, if an animal has the choice of producing one or a few offspring, or to put a lot of effort or little effort in offspring -- these are all examples of trade-offs. In order for species to thrive, they must choose what is best for them, leading to a clear distinction between r and K selected species.

The first variable is r (the intrinsic rate of natural increase in population size, density independent) and the second variable is K (the carrying capacity of a population, density dependent).
An r-selected species (e.g., many kinds of insects, such as aphids) is one that has high rates of fecundity, low levels of parental investment in the young, and high rates of mortality before individuals reach maturity. Evolution favors productivity in r-selected species.

In contrast, a K-selected species (such as humans) has low rates of fecundity, high levels of parental investment in the young, and low rates of mortality as individuals mature. Evolution in K-selected species favors efficiency in the conversion of more resources into fewer offspring. K-selected species generally experience stronger competition, where populations generally live near carrying capacity. These species have heavy investment in offspring, resulting in longer lived organisms, and longer period of maturation. Offspring of K-selected species generally have a higher probability of survival, due to heavy parental care and nurturing.

Top-Down and Bottom-Up Controls

Top-Down Controls 
In some populations, organisms in lower trophic levels are controlled by organisms at the top. This is known as top-down control.

For example, the presence of top carnivores keep herbivore populations in check. If there were no top carnivores in the ecosystem, then herbivore populations would rapidly increase, leading to all plants being eaten. This ecosystem would eventually collapse.

Bottom-Up Controls 
Bottom-up controls, on the other hand, are driven by producers in the ecosystem. If plant populations change, then the population of all species would be impacted.

For example, if plant populations decreased significantly, the herbivore populations would decrease, which would lead to a carnivore population decreasing too. Therefore, if all of the plants disappeared, then the ecosystem would collapse. Another example would be if there were too many plants available, then two herbivore populations may compete for the same food. The competition would lead to an eventual removal of one population.

Do all ecosystems have to be either top-down or bottom-up? 
An ecosystem does not have to be either top-down or bottom-up. There are occasions where an ecosystem could be bottom-up sometimes, such as a marine ecosystem, but then have periods of top-down control due to fishing.

Survivorship curves 

Survivorship curves show the distribution of populations according to age. Survivorship curves are important to be able to compare generations, populations, or even different species.

Humans and most other mammals have a type I survivorship because death occurs in older years. Typically, Type I survivorship curves characterize K-selected species.

Type II survivorship shows that death at any age is equally probable.

Type III curves indicate few surviving the younger years, but after a certain age, individuals are much more likely to survive. Type III survivorship typically characterizes r-selected species.

Metapopulation

Populations are also studied and conceptualized through the "metapopulation" concept. The metapopulation concept was introduced in 1969: "as a population of populations which go extinct locally and recolonize." Metapopulation ecology is a simplified model of the landscape into patches of varying levels of quality. Patches are either occupied or they are not. Migrants moving among the patches are structured into metapopulations either as sources or sinks. Source patches are productive sites that generate a seasonal supply of migrants to other patch locations. Sink patches are unproductive sites that only receive migrants. In metapopulation terminology there are emigrants (individuals that leave a patch) and immigrants (individuals that move into a patch). Metapopulation models examine patch dynamics over time to answer questions about spatial and demographic ecology. An important concept in metapopulation ecology is the rescue effect, where small patches of lower quality (i.e., sinks) are maintained by a seasonal influx of new immigrants. Metapopulation structure evolves from year to year, where some patches are sinks, such as dry years, and become sources when conditions are more favorable. Ecologists utilize a mixture of computer models and field studies to explain metapopulation structure.

Journals
The first journal publication of the Society of Population Ecology, titled Population Ecology (originally called Researches on Population Ecology) was released in 1952.

Scientific articles on population ecology can also be found in the Journal of Animal Ecology, Oikos and other journals.

See also
Density-dependent inhibition
Ecological overshoot
Irruptive growth
Lists of organisms by population
Overpopulation
Population density
Population distribution
Population dynamics
Population dynamics of fisheries
Population genetics
Population growth
Theoretical ecology

References

Further reading

Bibliography 

 
Applied statistics
Ecology